The Paramount is a historical nightclub and dance hall at 218 Yuyuan Road in Jing'an, Shanghai, China.  It was the largest ballroom in Shanghai before the People's Liberation Army established control over the city in 1949.

History
The Paramount, designed in Art Deco style by the architect S. J. Young (楊錫鏐 Yáng Xíliù, 1899-1978) was completed in 1933, by a group of Chinese bankers. It lay just off Bubbling Well Road (now Nanjing West Road), a major entertainment thoroughfare and was a meeting place for the wealthy elite of Shanghai society. The Ballroom lasted under its original owners before going bankrupt in 1936. In 1937, it was converted into a taxi dance hall featuring Chinese dance hostesses, which it remained until 1949.

In 1956, following the Chinese Communist Revolution, the Paramount was closed and it later reopened as the Red Capitol Cinema showing Maoist propaganda films. As a result of the Cultural Revolution, the building became defunct and obscure.  On a rainy day in 1990, part of the structure's façade collapsed and killed a passerby on a sidewalk.

In 2001, Taiwanese investors spent $3-million to refurbish the venue and reopened it as a ballroom in its original style, with red-and-gold décor.

In December 2006, the Paramount's Taiwanese owners announced the ballroom was losing revenue, so they decided to convert the second and third floors into a disco. Only the fourth-floor ballroom will remain in the old style, and preservationists have expressed concerns that the structure could be damaged by the reverberations of the disco.

In the last item from the BBC Radio Program: "From Our Own Correspondent" on June 16th, 2012, Fuchsia Dunlop reported on a dance visit to the refurbished Paramount.

In July 2012, Tangobang chose this venue for the Shanghai Tango Festival. In March 2017, the Paramount reopened as a nightclub after it was renovated.

References

External links
"BBC Radio 4- From Our Own Correspondent"
Deco Theaters
"The Legacy of Chinese Architects" at China.org.cn

Art Deco architecture in Shanghai